Suzu may refer to:

Suzu (bell), small Japanese bells used in Shinto 
Suzu, Ishikawa, city in Ishikawa Prefecture, Japan
Sabzuyeh, Neyriz, also known as Sūzū, a village in Neyriz County, Fars Province, Iran

Temple names
Suzu was a Chinese temple name. It may refer to:
Emperor Ming of Jin (299–325)
Yuan Xie (died 508), regent of Northern Wei

People
, Japanese footballer 
, Japanese freestyle swimmer 
, Japanese actress and model
, Japanese actress
, Japanese professional wrestler

Fictional characters
 Bobobo suzu, a fictional character from the anime/manga series Bobobo-bo Bo-bobo
 Suzu, a fiction character from the anime, manga, and light novel series Nagasarete Airantō
 Suzu Nyanko, the human pseudonym of Sailor Tin Nyanko, in the Sailor Moon metaseries
 Suzu Hōjō, protagonist of In This Corner of the World
Suzu, a survivor of the fallen Crogenitor empire in Maxis' Action RPG, Darkspore.
 Suzu Naito, the fictional protagonist of 2021 Japanese animated science fantasy film Belle
 Suzu Minase, a character in the Revue Starlight franchise

Japanese feminine given names